Margaret "Marge" Roukema (née Scafati; September 19, 1929 – November 12, 2014) was an American politician who represented New Jersey in the U.S. House of Representatives for twenty-two years as a Republican from 1981 to 2003.

Early life and education
Roukema was born in Newark, New Jersey. She earned a Bachelor of Arts degree in history and political science from Montclair State College. She also took graduate history courses at Rutgers University–Newark.

Career 

Roukema began her career as a high school American history teacher in the Ridgewood Public Schools. She also served as a member of her Ridgewood School Board, becoming Vice President of the body in 1970.

U.S. House of Representatives
She was one of several Republicans swept into office by Reagan's coattails.

She was handily reelected in 1982 and nine more times after that with almost no opposition.

Roukema was a moderate Republican, as was the case with most Republicans from the Northeast. In 1992, she faced a primary challenge from a considerably more conservative Republican, Ira M. Marlowe, Louis Sette. In 1998, another conservative, State Assemblyman Scott Garrett, challenged her in the primary. Roukema managed to fight him off, and did so again in 2000.

Retirement
With the prospect of another primary challenge from Garrett in 2002 (in a district made even more conservative on paper by redistricting), as well as facing the loss of her subcommittee chairs due to caucus term limits, the Ridgewood Republican opted not to seek a 12th term and retired from politics. Garrett won the nomination with 45% of the vote and went on to win the seat, despite Roukema's refusal to endorse him. State Senator Gerald Cardinale, who Roukema endorsed in the primary to succeed her, came in third with 25% of the vote, behind State Assemblyman David C. Russo with 26%.

She was an honorary board member of the National Organization of Italian American Women.

Death 
On November 12, 2014, Roukema died at Christian Health Care Center in Wyckoff, New Jersey at the age of 85. She had Alzheimer's disease.

See also
Women in the United States House of Representatives

References

External links

 

|-

1929 births
2014 deaths
American people of Italian descent
Deaths from Alzheimer's disease
Deaths from dementia in New Jersey
Female members of the United States House of Representatives
Montclair State University alumni
People from Ridgewood, New Jersey
Reformed Church in America members
Republican Party members of the United States House of Representatives from New Jersey
School board members in New Jersey
Women in New Jersey politics
20th-century American politicians
20th-century American women politicians
21st-century American politicians
21st-century American women politicians
Schoolteachers from New Jersey
American women educators